Pöide Parish was a municipality in Saare County, Estonia. The municipality covered an area of 123.6 km² (47.7 mi²) and had a population of 953 (as of 1 January 2006).

During the administrative-territorial reform in 2017, all 12 municipalities on the island Saaremaa were merged into a single municipality – Saaremaa Parish.

Villages
Ardla - Are - Iruste - Kahutsi - Kakuna - Kanissaare - Kärneri - Keskvere - Koigi -  Kõrkvere - Kübassaare - Leisi - Levala - Metsara - Mui - Muraja - Neemi - Nenu - Oti - Puka - Pöide - Reina - Sundimetsa - Talila - Tornimäe - Ula - Unguma - Uuemõisa - Välta - Veere

Pöide Church 
Pöide Church is located in Pöide Parish. Pöide St. Mary's church dominates the surrounding low countryside. Due to its massiveness, it gives the impression of a fortress rather than a church. Indeed, its history is entwined with Saaremaa's battles and fortresses. After the conquest of Saaremaa in 1227, the eastern part of Saaremaa belonged to the Livonian Order, who built a fortress at Pöide as their headquarters during the second half of the 13th century. This fortress was destroyed by the Saarlanders during the wave of uprisings against the occupying forces that took place in Estonia and Saaremaa during St.George's Night Uprising of 1343. There was a chapel on the southern side of the fortress, and the walls of this chapel form the central part of Pöide Church. The church was last burnt and its interior completely destroyed during World War II. It is slowly being restored.

Manors

 Pöide church Manor (Pastorat Peude)
 Audla (Hauküll) - A Knight manor
 Kahtla (Kachtla, Kjachtla) - A State manor
 Keskvere (Keskfer) - A State manor
 Kingli (Müllershof) - A Knight manor
 Koigi (Koik) - A Knight manor
 Kõiguste (Koigust) - A State manor
 Kübassaare (Kübbasaar) - A support manor of Uuemõisa manor
 Laimjala (Laimjall) - A Knight manor
 Maasi (Masik) - A State manor
 Muraja (Murajo) - A support manor of Uuemõisa manor
 Orissaare (Orrisaar) - A Knight manor
 Oti (Peudehof) - A Knight manor
 Reina or Salli (Saltack) - A Knight manor
 Saare (Holmhof) - A Knighthood manor
 Tumala (Thomel) - A Knight manor
 Uuemõisa (Neuenhof) - A State manor

See also 
Municipalities of Estonia

References

External links